Bahramabad or Bahram Abad, also rendered as Baramabad, may refer to:

Ardabil Province
Bahramabad, Parsabad, a village in Parsabad County

Chaharmahal and Bakhtiari Province
Bahramabad, Chaharmahal and Bakhtiari, a village in Shahrekord County

East Azerbaijan Province
Bahramabad, East Azerbaijan, a village in Osku County

Fars Province
Bahramabad, Kazerun, a village in Kazerun County
Bahramabad, Mohr, a village in Mohr County
Bahramabad, Pasargad, a village in Pasargad County

Golestan Province
Bahramabad, Golestan, a village in Gonbad-e Qabus County, Golestan Province, Iran

Hamadan Province
Bahramabad, Hamadan, a village in Hamadan County

Isfahan Province
Bahramabad, Isfahan, a village in Fereydunshahr County

Kerman Province
 Bahramabad, former name of Rafsanjan, a city in Kerman Province, Iran
Bahramabad, Anbarabad, a village in Anbarabad County
Bahramabad, Rigan, a village in Rigan County
Bahramabad, Eslamiyeh, a village in Rafsanjan County

Kermanshah Province
Bahramabad, Kermanshah, a village in Kermanshah County

Khuzestan Province
Bahramabad, Andika, a village in Andika County
Bahramabad, Abezhdan, a village in Andika County
Bahramabad, Masjed Soleyman, a village in Masjed Soleyman County
Bahramabad, Shushtar, a village in Shushtar County

Kurdistan Province
Bahramabad, Kurdistan, a village in Kurdistan Province, Iran
Bahram Abad, Bijar, a village in Bijar County

Lorestan Province
Bahramabad, Lorestan, a village in Lorestan Province, Iran
Bahramabad-e Olya, a village in Lorestan Province, Iran
Bahramabad-e Sofla, a village in Lorestan Province, Iran

Markazi Province
Bahramabad, Markazi, a village in Markazi Province, Iran

Qazvin Province
Bahramabad, Abyek, a village in Abyek County, Qazvin Province, Iran
Bahramabad, Qazvin, a village in Qazvin County, Qazvin Province, Iran
Bahramabad-e Qaqazan, a village in Qazvin County, Qazvin Province, Iran

Razavi Khorasan Province
Bahramabad, Razavi Khorasan, a village in Mashhad County, Razavi Khroasan Province, Iran

Sistan and Baluchestan Province
Bahramabad, Sistan and Baluchestan, a village in Sistan and Baluchestan Province, Iran

Tehran Province
Bahramabad, Tehran, a village in Tehran Province, Iran

West Azerbaijan Province
Bahramabad, West Azerbaijan, a village in Naqadeh County

See also
Beyramabad (disambiguation)